Ege Bagatur (22 February 1937–16 November 1990) is a Turkish politician, and served as the mayor of Adana from 1973 to 1977.

Biography
Ege Bagatur was born in Adana in 1937. He completed his primary and secondary education in Adana. In 1961, he graduated from Ankara University's school of law. After completing his law trainee and compulsory military service, he started to work as a lawyer in Adana in 1965. He then joined politics under Republican People's Party (CHP) and became the mayor of Adana in 1973 at the age of 36. He served as mayor until 1977. From 1977 to his death in 1990, he continued to work as a lawyer.

References

1937 births
1990 deaths
People from Adana
Republican People's Party (Turkey) politicians
Mayors of Adana
20th-century Turkish lawyers